Margarites costalis, common name the boreal rosy margarite or the northern ridged margarite, is a species of sea snail, a marine gastropod mollusk in the family Margaritidae.

Subspecies
 Margarites costalis baxteri J. H. McLean, 1995
 Margarites costalis costalis (Gould, 1841)

Description
The size of the shell varies between 5 mm and 25 mm. It is a conical, grayish (sometimes with rose or creamy tint), deeply umbilicate shell with five evenly rounded whorls. The sculpture shows strong, distant, spiral ridges, crossed by 10 to 12 fine, raised axial threads. The thin, finely crenulate outer lip is sharp. The pearly rose aperture is round.

(Original description by W.H. Dall of the synonym Margarites (Pupillaria) rudis) The shell is of moderate size. It is white with a pale olivaceous periostracum. The smooth nucleus consists of about one whorl and five subsequent whorls. The spiral sculpture consists of two strong cords with wider interspaces and a thud on which the suture is laid and which forms the margin of the base. There is also a small thread between the suture and the posterior cord and on the body whorl a similar thread in the interspaces. On the base there are six or seven smaller closer cords separated by obscurely channeled interspaces between the verge of a narrow umbilicus and the basal margin. The axial sculpture consists of (on the penultimate whorl about 20) retractive riblets extending from suture to periphery, with wider interspaces, slightly nodulous at the intersections with the spiral cords. There are also close obvious incremental regular lines over the whole surface. The simple, rounded aperture is quadrate. There is a glaze on the body. The inner lip is slightly thickened. The operculum is multispiral.

Distribution
This marine species occurs in circum-arctic waters; from Labrador, Canada and Greenland to Cape Cod, USA; from the Bering Strait to Southern Alaska

References

 Broderip, W. J. and G. B. Sowerby. 1829. Observations on new or interesting Mollusca contained, for the most part, in the museum of the Zoological Society. Zoological Journal 4: 359–379, pl. 9
 Couthouy, J. P. 1838. Descriptions of new species of Mollusca and shells, and remarks on several polypi found in Massachusetts Bay. Boston Journal of Natural History 2: 53–111, pls. 1–3.
 Möller, H. P. C. 1842. Index molluscorum Groenlandiae. Naturhistorisk Tidsskrift 4: 76–97. 
 Kiener, L. C. 1848. Genre Turbo. (Turbo, Lin.). Spécies Général et Iconographie des Coquilles Vivantes 10: pls. 1–16, 16[bis]-36
 Middendorff, A. T. von. 1849. Beiträge zu einer Malacozoologia Rossica. II. Aufzählung und Beschreibung der zur Meeresfauna Russlands gehörigen einschaler. Mémoires de l'Académie Impériale des Sciences de Saint-Pétersbourg, Sciences Naturelles (6)6: 329–516, pls. 1–11.
 Mörch, O. A. L. 1857. Fortegnelse over Gro/nlands Blo/ddyr. Gro/nland Geographisk og Statistisk Beskrevet 2: 75–100 Commission hos Universitetsboghandler: Kjo/benhavn.
Dautzenberg, P. and H. Fischer. 1912. Mollusques provenant des campagnes de l'Hirondelle et de la Princess-Alice dans les Mers du Nord. Résultats des Campagnes Scientifiques du Prince de Monaco 37: 631 pp., 2 maps, 11 plates
 Abbott, R.T. (1974). American Seashells. 2nd ed. Van Nostrand Reinhold: New York, NY (USA). 663 pp
 Gofas, S.; Le Renard, J.; Bouchet, P. (2001). Mollusca, in: Costello, M.J. et al. (Ed.) (2001). European register of marine species: a check-list of the marine species in Europe and a bibliography of guides to their identification. Collection Patrimoines Naturels, 50: pp. 180–213
 Kantor Yu.I. & Sysoev A.V. (2006) Marine and brackish water Gastropoda of Russia and adjacent countries: an illustrated catalogue. Moscow: KMK Scientific Press. 372 pp. + 140 pls. page(s): 32
 Gulbin V.V. & Chaban E.M. (2012) Annotated list of shell-bearing gastropods of Commander Islands. Part I. The Bulletin of the Russian Far East Malacological Society 15–16: 5–30.

External links
 

costalis
Gastropods described in 1841